David Vincent Bass Jr. (born September 11, 1990) is a former American football outside linebacker who played for five seasons in the National Football League. He was drafted by the Oakland Raiders in the seventh round of the 2013 NFL Draft. He also played for the Chicago Bears, Tennessee Titans, Seattle Seahawks, and New York Jets. He played college football at Missouri Western State.

Early life
Bass was a team captain for University City High School in St. Louis, and became an all-metro selection; Bass also was awarded the Fab-25 Demetrius Johnson Award, given to the top defensive linemen in Missouri and Illinois.

College career
Bass attended Missouri Western State, breaking the school record with 40.5 career sacks and 50 consecutive starts. In his senior year, Bass was a finalist for the Gene Upshaw Award and played in the East-West Shrine Game.

Professional career

Oakland Raiders
Bass was drafted by the Oakland Raiders in the seventh round (233rd overall) of the 2013 NFL Draft. On August 31, 2013, he was waived by the Raiders.

Chicago Bears
On September 1, Bass was claimed off waivers by the Chicago Bears. Bass made his first NFL start against the Detroit Lions in Week 10. The following week against the Baltimore Ravens, Bass intercepted Joe Flacco and returned the pick 24 yards for a touchdown, becoming the first Bears lineman to record a pick-six since Michael Haynes in 2004 against the Tennessee Titans, and the first Bears rookie defensive lineman to do so since Jon Norris in 1987 against the New Orleans Saints. On September 5, 2015, he was released by the Bears.

Tennessee Titans
On September 6, 2015, Bass was claimed off waivers by the Tennessee Titans. He was not re-signed following the 2016 season. Bass played in 29 games, starting seven, over his two seasons with the Titans. He had 52 tackles, 1.5 sacks, two fumble recoveries, and one interception with the team.

Seattle Seahawks
On May 9, 2017, Bass signed with the Seattle Seahawks. He was released on September 19, 2017. He had appeared in 2 games with one tackle.

New York Jets
On September 21, 2017, Bass signed with the New York Jets. Bass played in 13 games, starting three, logging 25 tackles and 3.5 sacks.

On April 30, 2018, Bass re-signed with the Jets. He was released on August 31, 2018.

Personal life
Bass became a franchise owner of The Exercise Coach in 2020 shortly after retiring from professional football.

References

External links
 Chicago Bears bio
 Oakland Raiders bio
 Missouri Western State Griffons bio

1990 births
Living people
American football defensive ends
Missouri Western Griffons football players
Oakland Raiders players
Players of American football from St. Louis
Chicago Bears players
Tennessee Titans players
Seattle Seahawks players
New York Jets players